Jel-Tiybes Botanical Reserve is a reserve located in Aksy District of Jalal-Abad Region of Kyrgyzstan to the northwest of Tash-Kömür. Its purpose is to conserve a reference section of semi-desert. Sporadic bushes of Caragana and pistachio grow in the area. Established in 1975, the reserve occupies 800 hectares.

References
 

Botanical reserves in Kyrgyzstan
Protected areas established in 1975